Shruti Bisht (born 22 January 2003) is an Indian film and television child actress. She played Ira in Ek Nayi Chhoti Si Zindagi. In 2011, she appeared in the television serial Hitler Didi as Indu.
She also played as Saloni in the fairy adventure comedy series Baal Veer on SAB TV. She also appeared in famous web series The Family Man as Mahima.

Early life 

Bisht was born on 22 January 2003 in Pauri Garhwal Uttrakhand, India. In 2013, she completed her fifth grade at St. Lawrence High School, as one of the top three on her class.

Television

Web series

Filmography

References

External links 
 
 

Living people
Indian child actresses
Indian television child actresses
Actresses from Uttarakhand
Indian television actresses
Year of birth uncertain
People from Pauri Garhwal district
2003 births